794 Irenaea (prov. designation:  or ) is a dark background asteroid from the outer regions of the asteroid belt. It was discovered on 27 August 1914, by Austrian astronomer Johann Palisa at the Vienna Observatory. It was likely named after Irene Hillebrand, daughter of Austrian astronomer Edmund Weiss (1837–1917).

Orbit and classification 

Irenaea is a non-family asteroid of the main belt's background population when applying the hierarchical clustering method to its proper orbital elements. It orbits the Sun in the outer main-belt at a distance of 2.2–4.1 AU once every 5 years and 6 months (2,021 days; semi-major axis of 3.13 AU). Its orbit has an eccentricity of 0.30 and an inclination of 5° with respect to the ecliptic. The body's observation arc begins at Bergedorf Observatory in Hamburg on 9 December 1915, more than a year after its official discovery observation at Vienna Observatory on 27 August 1914.

Naming 

According to Alexander Schnell, this minor planet was likely named after Irene Hillebrand, née Weiss, daughter of Austrian astronomer Edmund Weiss (1837–1917), director of the Vienna Observatory, and wife to astronomer  (1861–1939). The name received an aea-suffix as "Irene" was already given to asteroid 14 Irene. Palisa also named asteroid 722 Frieda after her daughter, Frieda Hillebrand.

Physical characteristics 

Irenaea is an assumed, carbonaceous C-type asteroid. The asteroid's low albedo around 0.05 (see below) agrees with this assumption.

Rotation period 

In May 2008, a rotational lightcurve of Irenaea was obtained from photometric observations by Italian amateur astronomer Silvano Casulli. Lightcurve analysis gave a rotation period of  hours with a brightness variation of  magnitude, indicative of an elongated shape.

Diameter and albedo 

The Collaborative Asteroid Lightcurve Link assumes a standard albedo for a carbonaceous C-type asteroid of 0.057 and calculates a diameter of 30.59 kilometers based on an absolute magnitude of 11.3.

References

External links 
 Lightcurve Database Query (LCDB), at www.minorplanet.info
 Dictionary of Minor Planet Names, Google books
 Asteroids and comets rotation curves, CdR – Geneva Observatory, Raoul Behrend
 Discovery Circumstances: Numbered Minor Planets (1)-(5000) – Minor Planet Center
 
 

000794
Discoveries by Johann Palisa
Named minor planets
19140827